György Balázs and Dudi Sela were the defending champions, but did not compete in the Juniors in this year.

Pablo Andújar and Marcel Granollers won in the final 6–3, 6–2 against Alex Kuznetsov and Mischa Zverev.

Seeds

Draw

Finals

Top half

Bottom half

References

Boys' Doubles
2004